Phasianini is a tribe of birds in the subfamily Phasianinae. It contains the true pheasants. Species in this tribe are found throughout Europe and Asia. This grouping was supported by a 2021 phylogenetic analysis of Galliformes, and accepted by the International Ornithological Congress. The tribe name is accepted by the Howard and Moore Complete Checklist of the Birds of the World.

Species

References 

Bird tribes
Phasianini